The Senior men's race at the 1997 IAAF World Cross Country Championships was held in Torino, Italy, at the Parco del Valentino on March 23, 1997.   A report on the event was given in The New York Times, in the Herald, and for the IAAF.

Complete results, medallists, and the results of British athletes were published.

Race results

Senior men's race (12.333 km)

Individual

†: Athlete marked in the results list as nonscorer.

Teams

Note: Athletes in parentheses did not score for the team result

Participation
An unofficial count yields the participation of 280 athletes from 58 countries in the Senior men's race.  This is in agreement with the official numbers as published.  Although announced, athletes from  did not show.

 (9)
 (1)
 (9)
 (4)
 (2)
 (7)
 (1)
 (1)
 (6)
 (8)
 (1)
 (5)
 (6)
 (1)
 (2)
 (1)
 (1)
 (6)
 (9)
 (7)
 (9)
 (1)
 (7)
 (6)
 (2)
 (1)
 (9)
 (1)
 (4)
 (10)
 (3)
 (6)
 (7)
 (6)
 (8)
 (9)
 (5)
 (7)
 (5)
 (9)
 (1)
 (6)
 (3)
 (2)
 (1)
 (9)
 (8)
 (1)
 (2)
 (2)
 (6)
 (7)
 (3)
 (1)
 (9)
 (9)
 (6)
 (2)

See also
 1997 IAAF World Cross Country Championships – Junior men's race
 1997 IAAF World Cross Country Championships – Senior women's race
 1997 IAAF World Cross Country Championships – Junior women's race

References

Senior men's race at the World Athletics Cross Country Championships
IAAF